Karagush (Qarağoş) is a rural locality (a selo) and the administrative centre of Karagushsky Selsoviet, Sterlibashevsky District, Bashkortostan, Russia. The population was 567 as of 2010. There are 10 streets.

Geography 
Karagush is located 20 km south of Sterlibashevo (the district's administrative centre) by road. Bakhcha is the nearest rural locality.

References 

Rural localities in Sterlibashevsky District